Zaranj Airport , also known as Nimruz Airport, is located some  east of the city of Zaranj in Afghanistan. It is a domestic airport under the country's Ministry of Transport and Civil Aviation (MoTCA), and serves the population of Nimruz Province. Security in and around the airport is provided by the Afghan National Security Forces.

The airport was located in the past in the northern section of Zaranj, which site is now under the Ministry of Defense. In addition to the Afghan Armed Forces and Afghan National Police, the U.S military and the International Security Assistance Force (ISAF) also had presence there.

The other closest Afghan airports to Zaranj Airport are Farah Airport in Farah Province to the north and Bost Airport in Helmand Province, which is around  highway driving distance to the east.

Airlines and destinations

The airport also handles charter civilian and military flights.

See also
List of airports in Afghanistan

References

External links

 
 Airport Records by Dr. Günther Eichhorn

Airports in Afghanistan
Nimruz Province
Buildings and structures in Nimruz Province